Laminacauda villagra is a species of sheet weaver found in the Juan Fernández Islands of Chile. It was described by Millidge in 1991.

References

Linyphiidae
Spiders described in 1991
Spiders of South America
Endemic fauna of Chile